Yuki Sasaki may refer to:

, Japanese mixed martial artist
, Japanese shogi player